Dupont, DuPont, Du Pont, duPont, or du Pont may refer to:

 Dupont (surname), a surname of French origin
 DuPont, one of the world's largest chemical companies, named following the surname
 DuPont (1802–2017), the original predecessor company that merged with Dow in 2017
 DowDuPont (2017–2019), former combined companies of Dow and DuPont
The Du Pont family

Companies
 Du Pont Motors, founded by E. Paul du Pont
 Dupont Brewery, a brewery in Belgium
 Gilbert Dupont, a French stock brokerage

Parks and sites
 Dupont Circle, historic district in Washington, D.C.
 DuPont State Forest, North Carolina
 Fort DuPont, Delaware
 Fort DuPont State Park, Delaware
 Fort Dupont Park, Washington, D.C.

Places
 Dupont, Colorado
 Du Pont, Georgia
 Dupont, Indiana
 Dupont, Pointe Coupee Parish, Louisiana
 Dupont, Ohio
 Dupont, Pennsylvania
 Dupont, Tennessee
 DuPont, Washington
 Dupont, Wisconsin

Transportation
 Dupont station, a subway station in Toronto, Canada
 DuPont station (Sound Transit), a planned commuter rail station in DuPont, Washington, US
 Dupont Circle station, a subway station in Washington, D.C., US
 USS Du Pont (DD-152)
 USS Du Pont (DD-941)

Other uses
 DuPont analysis, a financial analysis tool
 Dupont (band), a Swedish electronic music band
 DuPont Manual High School, Louisville, Kentucky
 Tour DuPont, a former bicycle race
 Nemours Alfred I. duPont Hospital for Children, Wilmington, Delaware
 DuPont connector, a form of electrical connector

See also
 Alexis I. duPont High School, Greenville, Delaware
 Alfred I. duPont Testamentary Trust
 Alfred I. duPont–Columbia University Award
 Dupond (disambiguation)
 Pont (disambiguation)

Surnames of French origin
Surnames of Belgian origin
French-language surnames